Hudson Bay Park is geographically located in north west Saskatoon just south of Circle Drive along 33rd Street and Avenue P North.  It is mainly characterized by single detached homes along with apartments that are less than five stories in height. Oliver Place and St. Joseph's Home are seniors residences located in this residential neighbourhood. This locale honours the pioneers of Saskatoon, as well as providing two very large park spaces which curve through the neighbourhood.  The community was under construction mainly during the post war years between 1940 and 1960 when there was a housing shortage.  The land for this neighbourhood was annexed during the City expansion around the time of 1910 to 1915. Following elementary school, students usually attend Mount Royal Collegiate in the neighboring area of Mount Royal or E.D. Feehan Catholic High School on Avenue M North a part of Westmount community.  In 2006, the average family size was 2.1 residents.  Statistics c2005 -

History
The Forestry Expo 2005 was recently held at Vic Rempel City Yards. In 2005, Mayfair School toured the yards as part of the Schools Plant Legacy in Trees (SPLIT)  program which promotes educational tree planting.  The greenhouses and nursery of Vic Rempel City Yards often hot various school classes.
The roadways are mainly named after settlers and Saskatoon pioneers.

Education

École Henry Kelsey School - public elementary, part of the Saskatoon Public School Division
St. Edward School - separate (Catholic) elementary, part of Greater Saskatoon Catholic Schools

Government and politics
Hudson Bay Park exists within the federal electoral district of Saskatoon West. It is currently represented by Sheri Benson of the New Democratic Party, first elected in 2015.

Provincially, the area is mostly within the constituency of Saskatoon Westview. It is currently represented by David Buckingham of the Saskatchewan Party, first elected in 2016. A small portion of the neighbourhood southwest of 33rd Street and Avenue I is within the constituency of Saskatoon Centre.

In Saskatoon's non-partisan municipal politics, Hudson Bay Park lies within ward 1. It is currently represented by Darren Hill, first elected in 2006.

Area Parks

Henry Kelsey Neighbourhood Park - 
Pierre Radisson Park - 
Henry Kelsey District Park - 
Riversdale Kiwanis Park - 
These parks host a variety of activities such as sports, recreational, play and fitness.

Transportation 

Circle Drive is a main thoroughfare through Saskatoon which connects with 33rd Street which runs through Hudson Bay Park.

City Transit
Hudson Bay Park is serviced by the City Transit Bus Route 3 (Hudson Bay Park/City Centre) & Route 7 (Dundonald/City Centre) of Saskatoon Transit.

Layout
The furthest roads to the east are Avenue H North (southerly section) and Avenue I North (Northerly section).  Circle Drive marks the north and west section as it runs diagonally across the corner.  31st Street is the southernmost boundary.

Riversdale Kiwanis Park is along the south west corner running along Edmonton Avenue which runs within the neighbourhood parallel to Circle Drive.  City of Saskatoon Vic Rempel Yards: Greenhouses and nursery are along 33rd Street and Avenue P North. St. Edward School is on Avenue P North across the street from the City tree Nursery.  Henry Kelsey Park is along Avenue I North and Howell Avenue in the North east corner.  Henry Kelsey School is located in the southern edge of the park along 33rd Street East.

Shopping
On Avenue P North is a small strip mall which contains Bow wow boutique at 1619 29th Street West.  There are doctor's offices, Hair N' More, Bamboo Bistro Ltd in this strip mall as well as other amenities.  There used to be a small grocery store at one time.  At 33rd St and Ave P, on the south-west corner is a small strip mall with a family restaurant and lounge called the Mediterranean Inn.  At the north-west corner is the Westview Co-op, including a Credit Union, grocery store and service station, both originally built in the 1960s.  The service station was demolished and rebuilt in October 2014, and a new grocery store opened in May 2015.  A stand-alone Credit Union was also built, opening in April 2015.

See also
 List of shopping malls in Saskatoon

Life
Kelsey Community Association provides recreational activities for the neighbourhoods of Kelsey, Hudson Bay, McNab Park, and Mayfair.

References

External links 

Local Area Planning
Saskatoon Neighbourhoods Word Search Puzzle
City of Saskatoon City of Saskatoon · Departments · Community Services · City Planning · ZAM Maps
Populace Spring 2006

Neighbourhoods in Saskatoon